Claire is a 1924 German silent film directed by Robert Dinesen and starring Lya De Putti, Eduard von Winterstein and Theodor Loos.

Cast
 Lya De Putti 
 Eduard von Winterstein 
 Theodor Loos 
 Erich Kaiser-Titz
 Frida Richard 
 Maria Peterson 
 Eberhard Leithoff 
 Alfred Haase 
 Johanna Zimmermann

References

Bibliography
 Bock, Hans-Michael & Bergfelder, Tim. The Concise CineGraph. Encyclopedia of German Cinema. Berghahn Books, 2009.

External links

1924 films
Films of the Weimar Republic
Films directed by Robert Dinesen
German silent feature films
German black-and-white films